Together is a song by Belgian recording artist Selah Sue. It was written by Sue, Evan Kidd Bogart, Ludwig Goransson, and Childish Gambino for her second studio album Reason (2015), the latter of which also appears a guest vocalist on the song. Distributed by Warner Music Group, it was released as the album's second single by Because Music on February 22, 2016.

Charts

Weekly charts

References

External links
SelahSue.com – official website

2015 songs
2016 singles
Selah Sue songs
Because Music singles
Songs written by Selah Sue
Songs written by E. Kidd Bogart
Songs written by Ludwig Göransson
Songs written by Donald Glover